The Chris Morris Music Show is a radio show that was presented by satirist Chris Morris and broadcast on BBC Radio 1 between June and December 1994. The show sparked controversy on several occasions, most notably when Chris Morris falsely announced the death of politician Michael Heseltine, which resulted in a two-week suspension of the show.

Format
Each episode of The Chris Morris Music Show lasted approximately one hour, except for the final episode on 26 December 1994, which was two hours.

Broadcast information
The Chris Morris Music Show was normally broadcast on Wednesday evenings between 9pm and 10pm. Episodes were aired each week between 1 June 1994 and 21 December 1994, with the exception of 13 and 21 July, when the show was suspended after the Michael Heseltine controversy. For some weeks, repeats were aired rather than new shows, such as when Morris was on holiday at the beginning of September.

Premature obituaries

In the final show, broadcast on Boxing Day 1994, Chris Morris falsely announced another death, this time of television and radio personality Jimmy Savile. In response to the show, Savile sued the BBC and claimed that the false report had ruined his Christmas.

References

BBC Radio 1 programmes